Ingo Porges (born 22 August 1938) is a German former footballer who played as a midfielder for FC St. Pauli. He made one appearance for the West Germany national team.

External links
 
 

1938 births
Living people
German footballers
Footballers from Hamburg
West German footballers
Association football midfielders
Germany international footballers
FC St. Pauli players